Alexander Anatolyevich Vysotsky (born July 24, 1968) is a former Kazakhstani professional  ice hockey player, who played for Kazakhstan National Hockey Team. Vysotsky is the graduate of Karagandy ice hockey school. He is the former head coach of Barys Astana and HC Almaty.

Coaching career
2006-2007 Saryarka Karagandy - assistant coach
2007 Barys Astana - assistant coach
2007-2009 Barys Astana - head coach
2009-2010 Kazakhstan national ice hockey team - assistant coach
2010-2013 HC Almaty - head coach
2013–present Nomad Astana - head coach

External links

1968 births
Avtomobilist Karagandy players
Barys Astana head coaches
Barys Nur-Sultan players
Dizel Penza players
HK Neman Grodno players
Kazakhmys Satpaev players
Kazakhstani ice hockey coaches
Kazakhstani ice hockey forwards
Living people
Neftyanik Almetyevsk players
Soviet ice hockey forwards
Sportspeople from Karaganda
Tivali Minsk players
Yuzhny Ural Orsk players